Shalva Lomidze (born December 31, 1977) is a major general of intelligence serving as the 8th head of the Georgian Intelligence Service since April 24, 2021.

Career
Shalva Lomidze started his career in 1999 on various positions in Counterintelligence Service of the Ministry of State Security of Georgia and in 2004 he continued working in the Counter-Espionage Department of the Ministry of State Security of Georgia.

He joined the Ministry of Internal Affairs of Georgia (MIA) in 2005 and from 2005 to 2012, he held several positions in Counterintelligence Department. In 2012 Lomidze was appointed as the Head of the Main Division of Information-Analytical Department of MIA.

In 2014 he started working in Georgian Intelligence Service (GIS), where he Served as Deputy Head of the Directorate and as Head of Directorate. He became First Deputy Head of Georgian Intelligence Service in 2014 and from 2020 to 2021 he served as acting Head of GIS.

on April 23, 2021, Shalva Lomidze was appointed as the Head of Georgian Intelligence Service.

References
 
 

Intelligence analysts
Political office-holders in Georgia (country)
1977 births
Living people
21st-century politicians from Georgia (country)